Damgheh-ye Kuchek (also Romanized as Dāmgheh-ye Kūchek; also known as Dāmgām, Damgeh, and Dāmgheh) is a village in Mosharrahat Rural District, in the Central District of Ahvaz County, Khuzestan Province, Iran. At the 2006 census, its population was 324, in 72 families.

References 

Populated places in Ahvaz County